Glen Michael Angus (August 18, 1970 – July 19, 2007) was a Canadian artist whose work has appeared in role-playing games and video games.

Early life
Angus was born August 18, 1970, in Windsor, Ontario. He played the Dungeons & Dragons role-playing game as a child, which his father Jim Angus said cultivated his son's passion for the fantasy genre.

Career
Angus began producing interior illustrations for Dungeons & Dragons books in 1994. He also illustrated cards for the Magic: The Gathering collectible card game.

He also worked for Ravensoft on the X-Men Legends video game, in which his art appeared. He worked for four years as an artist at Raven Software/Activision, and at the time of his death he was a principal artist for Ravensoft/Activision.

Personal life
Angus taught graphic and computer art at St. Clair College, which he previously attended. He taught there for five years as a teacher of illustration and graphic design. Angus and his family moved to Wisconsin, USA, in 2002.

Angus died suddenly on July 19, 2007, from a sudden heart failure at age 36 in Verona, Wisconsin, where he lived with his wife and two children.

References

External links

1970 births
2007 deaths
Artists from Windsor, Ontario
Artists from Wisconsin
People from Verona, Wisconsin
Role-playing game artists